My Autobiography may refer to:

 My Autobiography (Chaplin), by Charlie Chaplin
 My Autobiography (Mussolini), by Benito Mussolini
 My Autobiography, by Kevin Keegan
 My Autobiography: A Fragment, by Max Müller
 My Autobiography and Reminiscences, by William Powell Frith
 My Autobiography, by Sir Alex Ferguson
 My Autobiography (Miedzianik), by David Miedzianik